Azizuddin is a surname. Notable people with the surname include:

Fakir Azizuddin (1780–1845), Prime minister of the Sikh Empire
Tariq Azizuddin, Pakistani diplomat

See also 

Alamgir II, Mughal Emperor 1754-59 (birth name Aziz-ud-Din Muhammad)
Azizudin Ahmad